Peter Aloysius McInerney , (1927-2014) was an Australian barrister and New South Wales Supreme Court judge.

Biography
McInerney was born in Goulburn, New South Wales, the only child of grazier Leslie McInerney and his wife, Florence (née Smith). Forebears had farmed in the Southern Tablelands for more than 150 years, and Peter grew up on the family property, Moonyah, near Collector.

His initial education was by correspondence, then at the tiny Breadalbane Primary School. He completed his Leaving Certificate in 1945 at St. Joseph's College in Hunters Hill, where he led the senior debating team. He matriculated to receive a double degree in Arts and Law from the University of Sydney.

Career

Legal career
After graduation, McInerney commenced as an associate to New South Wales Supreme Court judges John Clancy and Cyril Walsh. He was admitted to the New South Wales Bar in 1955 and practised from Selborne Chambers focussing on common and criminal law. He represented many clients in the Newcastle and Broken Hill regions in industrial injury matters and appeared in a number of cases for battered women accused of murdering their husbands. He was a brilliant trial advocate, always meticulously prepared.

He was appointed a Queen's Counsel (QC) in 1974 and appeared for prisoners in the Nagle Royal Commission(1976–78) into the Bathurst prison riots.

Judicial career
He was appointed a judge of the Supreme Court of New South Wales in 1985. He presided over many high-profile trials including that of Gregory Allen Brown the Downunder Hostel arsonist.

In 1997, the long convicted sadistic murderer Kevin Crump successfully applied to the Supreme Court of NSW to convert his life sentence into a minimum term and an additional term. McInerney heard the appeal and maintained the severity of the initial term, sentencing Crump to a minimum term of 30 years and an additional term for the remainder of his life  In February 2016 the NSW Court of Criminal Appeal dismissed Crump's application for leave to appeal McInerney's 1997 sentence determination.

Other appointments
McInerney was called out of retirement twice to head judicial inquiries into the Glenbrook (1999)  and the Waterfall (2003) rail accidents.

Personal life
He married Jeanette Hardie in 1956, and the couple raised five children in Killara, New South Wales. For seventeen years he was President of The Australian Golf Club in Sydney.

References

1927 births
Australian Roman Catholics
2014 deaths
People educated at St Joseph's College, Hunters Hill
Sydney Law School alumni
Judges of the Supreme Court of New South Wales
Australian King's Counsel